Dominator is a floorless roller coaster located at Kings Dominion amusement park in Doswell, Virginia. Built by Bolliger & Mabillard, it originally opened in 2000 as Batman: Knight Flight at Six Flags Ohio (later renamed to Six Flags Worlds of Adventure in 2001) in Aurora, Ohio. It obtained its current name when Cedar Fair purchased the park and renamed it back to Geauga Lake in 2004. Following the park's permanent closure in 2007, the roller coaster was relocated to Kings Dominion where it opened in the International Street section of the park on May 24, 2008.

History

Geauga Lake era (2000–2007)
Batman: Knight Flight was unveiled at a media event held on December 9, 1999, described as the only floorless roller coaster in the Midwest and one of five like it in the world. The ride was planned as part of a major expansion project, along with extensive changes, in an effort to rebrand Geauga Lake as Six Flags Ohio for the 2000 season. Batman: Knight Flight was constructed in the Gotham City section of the park, which is a themed area common among other Six Flags parks. The coaster opened to the public on May 5, 2000.

Six Flags Ohio was later renamed in 2001 to Six Flags Worlds of Adventure, and in March 2004, Cedar Fair acquired the theme park and restored the original Geauga Lake name. The park was stripped of Looney Tunes and DC Comics branding. In the process, Batman: Knight Flight was renamed Dominator, and all Batman branding was removed from the trains and station.

In August 2007, rumors of Dominator being relocated to Kings Dominion began to surface. Following Cedar Fair's announcement in September 2007 that Geauga Lake's amusement park would cease to operate, leaving only the Wildwater Kingdom water park, plans were made to relocate many of its rides to other parks. Dominator's last day of operation before the move was September 16, 2007, although its destination was not specified.

Kings Dominion era (2008–present)
On October 23, 2007, it was announced that Dominator would be moved to Kings Dominion. It was rebuilt on the former site of the bus parking lot, behind Berserker, an Intamin Looping Starship. When it was relocated to Kings Dominion, it received a new paint job. The supports remained dark blue, but the track was repainted orange with the exception of the vertical loop, which remains painted yellow. It opened to the public on May 24, 2008.

Ride experience
While at Geauga Lake, the ride was notable for interacting with the lake numerous times throughout the course. When it was relocated to Kings Dominion, it was built behind the Berserker, in the International Street section of the park on the former bus parking lot.

Layout

Following the loop, riders go through an overbanked right turn (which at Geauga Lake passed over the ride entrance) and rise up into a turnaround above the station. After the turn, riders enter a cobra roll. The train then rises uphill, makes a left turn under the lift hill, and enters the mid-course brake run. After the brakes, there is a small drop into a pair of interlocking corkscrews. Following the corkscrews, the train completes a 135-degree curve to the left that dives into a 270-degree curve along the ground, entering the final brake run. One cycle of the ride lasts about 2 minutes and 6 seconds.

Trains
Dominator operates with three open-air steel-and-fiberglass trains. Each train has eight cars that have four seats in a single row for a total of 32 riders per train. Riders are secured by an over-the-shoulder restraint with a lap belt. In 2014, the seat color was changed from purple to black, and the restraint (previously all orange) added black to its color scheme.

Track

When the coaster first opened at Geauga Lake in 2000, it was painted with blue supports, yellow track and unpainted rails. When Dominator was relocated to Kings Dominion, the supports remained blue and the rails remained unpainted. The track was painted orange but the loop remained yellow.

Theme
As Batman Knight Flight, the coaster was the star attraction of the Gotham City themed area and featured Batman theming. When Cedar Fair bought the park in 2004 the name was changed and all the Batman theming had to be removed before opening day. There has been no theme for the ride while it has been owned by Cedar Fair.

Incidents

On July 20, 2012, a 48-year-old woman from Pitt County, North Carolina, was found unresponsive on Dominator after its train returned to the ride's station. An incident report described that she had a "seizure-like episode" after riding the roller coaster. The woman was taken to a hospital, where she died. Autopsy results revealed that she had a brain aneurysm. The ride reopened on July 23, 2012, after it passed two safety inspections.

References

External links

 Dominator's Official Page
 
 Photo gallery at COASTER-net.com

Geauga Lake
Former roller coasters in Ohio
Roller coasters introduced in 2000
Roller coasters in Virginia
Roller coasters operated by Cedar Fair
Amusement rides that closed in 2007
Floorless Coaster roller coasters manufactured by Bolliger & Mabillard